The 1992 AFC Asian Cup was the 10th edition of the men's AFC Asian Cup, a quadrennial international football tournament organised by the Asian Football Confederation (AFC). The finals were held in Hiroshima Prefecture, Japan between 29 October and 8 November 1992. The host nation, Japan, defeated the defending champion Saudi Arabia in the final in Hiroshima.

This was the first Asian Cup not to have any debuting countries.

Stadiums

Qualification

Squads

First round
All times are Japan Standard Time (UTC+9)

Group A

Group B

Knockout stage
All times are Japan Standard Time (UTC+9)

Semi-finals

Third place play-off

Final

Winners

Awards

MVP (Most Valuable Player)
 Kazuyoshi Miura

Top Scorer
 Fahad Al-Bishi – 3 goals

Statistics

Goalscorers

With three goals, Fahad Al-Bishi is the top scorer in the tournament. In total, 31 goals were scored by 24 different players, with none of them credited as own goal.

3 goals
 Fahad Al-Bishi

2 goals

 Peng Weiguo
 Masashi Nakayama
 Kim Kwang-min
 Saeed Al-Owairan
 Yousuf Al-Thunayan

1 goal

 Xie Yuxin
 Li Bing
 Li Xiao
 Hao Haidong
 Sirous Ghayeghran
 Farshad Pious
 Kazuyoshi Miura
 Masahiro Fukuda
 Tsuyoshi Kitazawa
 Takuya Takagi
 Mubarak Mustafa
 Khalifa Al-Sulaiti
 Mahmoud Soufi
 Khalid Al-Muwallid
 Thanis Areesngarkul
 Khalid Ismail
 Khamees Saad Mubarak
 Zuhair Bakhit

Top scoring teams

8 goals

6 goals

3 goals

2 goals

1 goal

Final positions

References

External links
RSSSF Details

 
AFC Asian Cup tournaments
AFC Asian Cup
AFC Asian Cup
International association football competitions hosted by Japan
October 1992 sports events in Asia
November 1992 sports events in Asia
Sports competitions in Hiroshima